Échevannes may refer to the following places in France:

Échevannes, Côte-d'Or, a commune in the department of Côte-d'Or
Échevannes, Doubs, a commune in the department of Doubs